Mashco may refer to the following languages:

 Amarakaeri language
 Mashco Piro language
 Yine language
There is also an unclassified language of Peru by this name